The 2022 San Jose State Spartans football team represented San Jose State University as a member of the Mountain West Conference during the 2022 NCAA Division I FBS football season. They were led by head coach Brent Brennan, who was coaching his sixth season with the program. The Spartans played their home games at CEFCU Stadium in San Jose, California.

Returning starters included linebacker Kyle Harmon who ranked second nationally with 133 total tackles (72 unassisted, 61 assisted) during the 2021 season.

Schedule
San Jose State and the Mountain West Conference announced the 2022 football schedule on February 16, 2022.

Rankings

Roster

Awards and honors

Mountain West individual awards
The following individuals received postseason awards and honors as voted by the Mountain West Conference football coaches at the end of the season.

All-conference teams
The following players were selected as part of the Mountain West's All-Conference Teams.

Notes

References

San Jose State
San Jose State Spartans football seasons
San Jose State Spartans football